Karaköy, the modern name for the old Galata, is a commercial quarter in the Beyoğlu district of Istanbul, Turkey, located at the northern part of the Golden Horn mouth on the European side of Bosphorus.

Karaköy is one of the oldest and most historic districts of the city, and is today an important commercial center and transport hub. It is connected with the surrounding neighborhoods by streets radiating out from Karaköy Square. The Galata Bridge links Karaköy to Eminönü to the southwest, Tersane Street links it to Azapkapı to the west, Voyvoda Street (Bankalar Caddesi) links it to Şişhane to the northwest, the steeply sloping Yüksek Kaldırım Street links it to Pera in the north, and Kemeraltı Street and Necatibey Street link it to Tophane to the northeast.

The commercial quarter, which was originally the meeting place for banks and insurance companies in the 19th century, is today also home to mechanical, electrical, plumbing and electronic parts suppliers.

Etymology
The word Karaköy apparently combines the Turkish words "kara", usually meaning "black", and "köy" meaning "village". In this case, however, "kara" may have come from the Turkish word "Karay", referring to the Turkic-speaking Jewish community called the Crimean Karaites. Though, linguists such as Sevan Nişanyan contest this theory by claiming that it isn't supported by written sources.

History
Karaköy has been a port area since Byzantine times when the north shore of the Golden Horn was a separate settlement facing Stamboul/Constantinople over the water. After the re-conquest of the city from the Latin State in 1261, the Byzantine emperor granted Genoese merchants permission to settle and do business here as part of a defense pact.

The district developed rapidly, and the Genoese built sturdy fortifications to protect themselves and their warehouses. Fragments of the Genoese walls are still visible, but the Galata Tower, at the highest point, is the most substantial relic of the old walled enclave. Fifteenth-century Galata probably looked much more like an Italian city than a Byzantine or Ottoman one.

In 1455, shortly after the conquest of Constantinople, the district had three categories of inhabitants: temporarily sojourning Genoese, Venetian and Catalan merchants; Genoese with Ottoman citizenship; and Greeks, Armenians and Jews. The composition of the population quickly changed: according to a census of 1478, almost half the local population was Muslim. From 1500 on, Sephardic Jews settled here after they were expelled from Spain in 1492.

The French poet André Chénier was born in Karaköy in 1762; his father was a French merchant and diplomat, his mother an Ottoman Greek.

Karaköy experienced a second wave of Christian arrivals when British,  French and Italian forces of the Allies came to Istanbul to fight in the Crimean War (1854–1856). The lack of piers made the unloading of troops and military equipment difficult so in 1879, a French company obtained a concession to build  a new quay in Karaköy, which was completed in 1895.

In the last decade of the 19th century, Karaköy developed into a banking and insurance hub, especially along Voyvoda Street (Bankalar Caddesi). The Ottoman Bank established its headquarters here  while Italian and Austrian insurance companies opened branch offices.

As trading activity increased in the early 20th century, the port was expanded with customs buildings, passenger terminals and naval warehouses. Karaköy also became famous for the Greek taverns along the quay.

After 1917, thousands of White Russians fleeing the Bolshevik Revolution landed here and settled in the area.

Transport

Modern Karaköy is a major transport hub.

The Galata Bridge connects Karaköy with Eminönü and the historic parts of Istanbul; the T1 tram line crosses the bridge, linking Karaköy to Kabataş and Bağcılar. The Tünel funicular runs from Karaköy up to Tünel station at the start of İstiklal Caddesi.

Şehir Hatları ferries leave for Kadıköy and Üsküdar on the Asian shore of the Bosphorus, as well as for terminals along the Golden Horn as far as Eyüp.

Cruise ships from Mediterranean ports such as Piraeus in Greece, Dubrovnik in Croatia, Civitavecchia (Rome) and Venice in Italy  berth at the nearby Galataport complex.

Commerce
An active business center for centuries, Karaköy remains an important commercial hub for Istanbul. All kinds of hardware, tools, plumbing items and spare parts are for sale in Tersane Street in Perşembe Pazarı (literally Thursday Market). Selanik Pasajı, a shopping center right on Karaköy Square, contains shops specialising in electronic parts. The underpass providing safe passage under the busy square contains more shops.

Karaköy is a popular place to eat especially seafood, with several fish restaurants gathered around the local fish market. More fish restaurants line the underside of the Galata Bridge. Galataport is a large new dining and shopping development along the waterside.

Before the Covid pandemic, Istanbul's red-light district could also be found in Karaköy. However, in 2022 it was announced that the streets once filled with brothels (and where there are still the remains of a synagogue) would be redeveloped as an arts district.

Sites of interest

Karaköy contains many churches representing the Latin Catholic, Greek Orthodox, Turkish Orthodox, Russian Orthodox, Armenian and Bulgarian rites as well as a couple of Jewish synagogues. The Greek, Jewish, French, Italian and Austrian schools reflect its past cosmopolitan character.

The curvy Camondo Steps, off Voyvoda Street, were donated by the wealthy Sephardic Jewish banker Abraham Camondo (1785–1873) and built in baroque style.

The large Galataport hotel, restaurant and cafe, shopping and office mixed-use development opened along the water in 2022.

Museums
 Jewish Museum of Turkey
 Ottoman Bank Museum

Note: The Istanbul Modern, Turkey's first private museum dedicated to contemporary art since 2004, moved to a new location in Galataport in 2022.

Places of worship 
Churches
 San Pietro and Paolo Church, a Dominican church built 1604 by the Genoese next to their old Dominican convent, and rebuilt 1841–1843 by the Swiss Italian architect Gaspare Fossati, after having been destroyed twice by fire
 Sankt Georg Church, built 1675–1677 by Franciscan priests and restored 1908 by Austrian Lazarists
 San Michele Church
 San Francesco Church
 Santa Anna Church
 Santa Maria Church
 San Domenico Church
 San Zani Church
 Surp Sarkis Church built around 1360, the oldest Armenian church in Istanbul
 Surp Hisus Pırgiç Church, an Armenian Catholic church built 1834, served as the patriarchal seat from 1850 up to 1928, when the Patriarch moved to Beirut
 Surp Kirkor Lusavoric Armenian Church (1965)
 Saint Benoit Church and Monastery, a complex of church, monastery, school, hospital and orphanage built in 1427 by the Benedictines
 Galata Bulgarian Catholic Church, a small church built in early 20th century for the needs of the Catholic Bulgarian community.
 Haghios Nikolaos Turkish Orthodox Church
 Haghios Ionnis Syriac Church

Synagogues
 Tofre Begadim Synagogue (Schneider Synagogue) (used today as an art gallery)
 Italian Synagogue
 Zulfaris Synagogue
 Or Hodeş Synagogue, built in 1897 by Georgian Jews , now in ruins.
 Yüksek Kaldırım Ashkenazi Synagogue, built in 1900 by architect Gabriel Tedeschi

Mosques
 Arap Mosque with its square-shaped minaret, the oldest mosque in Istanbul to be converted from a church, was used by Arab immigrants fleeing the Spanish Inquisition
 Sokullu Mosque or Azapkapi Mosque
 Yeralti Mosque (the Underground Mosque) built in the 17th century

Education
 Österreichisches St. Georgs-Kolleg Istanbul
 Deutsche Schule Istanbul (Özel Alman Lisesi) – private school teaching in German
 Liceo Scientifico Italiano
 St. Benoit High School, founded 1583 by French Jesuit missionaries and co-educational since 1987
 Karaköy Greek Orthodox High school
 Getronagan Armenian High School, founded in 1886

Notable natives
 André Chénier, French poet associated with the French Revolution.

References

External links

 Historical Galata Modern Karaköy
 Sihirli Tur 

Quarters of Beyoğlu
Golden Horn
Jewish communities in Turkey
Transit centers in Istanbul
Beyoğlu